Betty Slade may refer to:

 Betty Pariso (born 1956), née Slade, American bodybuilder
 Betty Slade (diver) (1921–2000), British diver